Miquel Nelom (born 22 September 1990) is a Dutch professional footballer who plays as a left back. Nelom has previously played in his homeland for Excelsior, Feyenoord, Sparta Rotterdam and Willem II, and for Scottish club Hibernian. He represented the Netherlands in two full international matches, both in 2013.

Club career
Nelom made his professional debut for Excelsior on 9 October 2009. He replaced Tobias Waisapy in the 90th minute of an Eerste Divisie away match against HFC Haarlem (0–1). With Excelsior's surprising promotion in the season 2010–11, Nelom managed to make his Eredivisie debut on 7 August 2010. However, he couldn't prevent Excelsior losing the season opening match against De Graafschap (3-0). 

Nelom moved to Feyenoord in 2011. He played in over 100 Eredivisie matches for the club, helping them win the league championship in 2016–17 and the Dutch Cup in 2015–16. After a loan spell with Sparta Rotterdam in the early part of 2018, Nelom left Feyenoord at the end of the 2017–18 season.

Nelom signed a one-year contract with Scottish Premiership club Hibernian on 20 September 2018. He was released by Hibernian in May 2019.

He signed for Willem II in September 2019.

International career
Born in the Netherlands, Nelom is of Surinamese descent. In May 2013, Nelom was part of the Netherlands national team for a mini-tour of Asia. Nelom made his full international debut in a friendly against Indonesia.

Career statistics

Club

International
.

Honours
Feyenoord
 Eredivisie: 2016–17
 KNVB Cup: 2015–16
 Johan Cruijff Shield: 2017

References

External links
 
 Netherlands stats at OnsOranje

1990 births
Living people
Association football fullbacks
Dutch footballers
Dutch sportspeople of Surinamese descent
Footballers from Rotterdam
Excelsior Rotterdam players
Sparta Rotterdam players
Eredivisie players
Eerste Divisie players
Feyenoord players
Willem II (football club) players
Netherlands youth international footballers
Netherlands under-21 international footballers
Netherlands international footballers
Dutch expatriate footballers
Expatriate footballers in Scotland
Hibernian F.C. players
Scottish Professional Football League players
VV Spijkenisse players